A negotiator is a person who engages in negotiation.

Negotiator may also refer to:

The Negotiator, a 1998 action film starring Samuel L. Jackson and Kevin Spacey
The Negotiator (novel), an unrelated 1989 crime novel by Frederick Forsyth
iRobot Negotiator, an unmanned robot from the iRobot Corporation
 Negotiator (TV series), a 2018 Chinese TV series starring Yang Mi and Huang Zitao
 Negotiator (2003 film)